The 2019 CONMEBOL Recopa Sudamericana was the 27th edition of the CONMEBOL Recopa Sudamericana (also referred to as the Recopa Sudamericana), the football competition organized by CONMEBOL between the winners of the previous season's two major South American club tournaments, the Copa Libertadores and the Copa Sudamericana.

The competition was contested in two-legged home-and-away format between Argentine team River Plate, the 2018 Copa Libertadores champions, and Brazilian team Athletico Paranaense, the 2018 Copa Sudamericana champions. The first leg was hosted by Athletico Paranaense at the Arena da Baixada in Curitiba on 22 May 2019, while the second leg was hosted by River Plate on 30 May 2019 at the Estadio Monumental Antonio Vespucio Liberti in Buenos Aires.

River Plate won 3–1 on aggregate for their third Recopa Sudamericana title.

Teams

Venues

Format
The Recopa Sudamericana was played on a home-and-away two-legged basis, with the Copa Libertadores champions (River Plate) hosting the second leg. If tied on aggregate, the away goals rule would not be used, and 30 minutes of extra time would be played. If still tied after extra time, the penalty shoot-out would be used to determine the winner.

Matches

First leg

Second leg

See also
2018 Copa Libertadores Finals
2018 Copa Sudamericana Finals

References

External links
CONMEBOL Recopa, CONMEBOL.com 

2019
2019 in South American football
May 2019 sports events in South America
Club Atlético River Plate matches
Club Athletico Paranaense matches
2019 in Argentine football
2019 in Brazilian football
2019
Sport in Curitiba
2010s in Buenos Aires
21st century in Curitiba
International club association football competitions hosted by Argentina
International club association football competitions hosted by Brazil